is a Japanese former professional baseball outfielder. He has played in his entire career with the Nippon Professional Baseball (NPB) for the Hokkaido Nippon-Ham Fighters.

Career
Hokkaido Nippon-Ham Fighters selected Hakumura with the sixth selection in the 2013 Nippon Professional Baseball draft.

On June 27, 2016, Hakumura made his NPB debut.

On November 5, 2020, Hakumura announced his retirement.

References

External links

 NPB.com

1991 births
Living people
Baseball people from Gifu Prefecture
Hokkaido Nippon-Ham Fighters players
Japanese baseball players
Keio University alumni
Nippon Professional Baseball pitchers